Najeem Olaitan "Kunle" Olukokun (born 27 December 1990 in Oyo) is a Nigerian footballer, who is currently playing for Shooting Stars Sports Club.

Career
Olukokun Kunle began his career in the Steeb Football Academy and was then 2007 scouted by Prime F.C. He earned his first professional caps for Prime F.C. in the Nigerian Premier League and was on 20 February 2009 loaned out to R. Union Saint-Gilloise. On 17 July 2010 his club R. Union Saint-Gilloise pulled the sold option. In summer 2011 he returned to Nigeria and signed for Nigeria Premier League club. In the summer of 2012,he joined  Nigeria Premier League side Rising Stars F.C. In March 2013 left the last promoted Nigeria Premier League team Rising Stars and signed for Kwara United F.C. He also Won the Nigeria Player Of the Week in Week 3 of the Nigeria Professional Football League, he joined Shooting Stars F.C. After 6 appearances in week 6, he scored 3 goals in 6 games. He had scored 20 goals in 48 games for his present team Shooting Stars F.C.

References 

1990 births
Living people
Yoruba sportspeople
Sportspeople from Oyo State
Nigerian footballers
Royale Union Saint-Gilloise players
Nigerian expatriate sportspeople in Belgium
Osun United F.C. players
Nigerian expatriate footballers
Kwara United F.C. players
Rising Stars F.C. players
Shooting Stars S.C. players
Expatriate footballers in Belgium
Association football forwards